is a Japanese icebreaker operated by the Japan Maritime Self-Defense Force and is Japan's fourth icebreaker for Antarctic expeditions. She inherited her name from her predecessor.

She was launched in April 2008 and commissioned in May 2009 with the hull number AGB-5003. She began her first voyage on 10 November 2009.

Name 
In Japanese, the name "Shirase" is written in hiragana. Due to a JMSDF internal naming rule, an icebreaker must be named after a place. Accordingly, Shirase was named after the Shirase Glacier. This glacier bears the family name of Lieutenant Nobu Shirase, a Japanese pioneer in Antarctic exploration.

Operations 
In February 2013, the anti-whaling group Sea Shepherd Conservation Society claimed the Shirase was sent to monitor its interference with the Japanese cetacean research fleet. However, according to the National Institute of Polar Research, the icebreaker was in fact far to the west off the coast of Antarctica near the Showa Base, at the time. The Japanese government subsequently confirmed that the vessel was not involved in any operation related to the whaling program, and that Sea Shepherd's claims were "completely fake".

On 17 February 2014, the Shirase ran aground just off the unmanned Molodyozhnaya Station in Antarctica. While the outer hull was penetrated, the vessel was in no danger of sinking and no fuel oil leakage was reported.

On August 17, 2017, a CH-101 helicopter of the Japan Maritime Self-Defense Force assigned to the Shirase crashed at Iwakuni Air Base in Yamaguchi Prefecture. Four crewmembers were injured.

References

Icebreakers of Japan
Auxiliary ships of the Japan Maritime Self-Defense Force
2008 ships
Japanese Antarctic Program